The House of Limburg-Stirum (or Limburg-Styrum), which adopted its name in the 12th century from the immediate county of Limburg an der Lenne in what is now Germany, is one of the oldest families in Europe. It is the eldest and only surviving branch of the House of Berg, which was among the most powerful dynasties in the region of the lower Rhine during the Middle Ages. Some historians link them to an even older dynasty, the Ezzonen, going back to the 9th century.

The Limburg-Stirum were imperial counts within the Holy Roman Empire, until they were mediatised in 1806 by the Confederation of the Rhine. Although undisputedly a mediatised comital family, having enjoyed a dynastic status for over 600 years until the collapse of the Empire, they were omitted from the Almanach de Gotha because the branches of the family possessing mediatised lands were extinct by the time (1815) that the Congress of Vienna established the German Confederation's obligation to recognise their dynastic status.

Since the 9th century, the family counted five Counts Palatine of Lotharingia, several Dukes of Westphalia, Bavaria, Carinthia and Swabia, seven Archbishops of Cologne, one Prince-Bishop of Speyer, more than ten bishops in the Holy Roman Empire, and at least two saints of the Catholic Church (Saint Richenza, celebrated on 21 March, and Saint Engelbert of Cologne, celebrated on 7 November).

The territorial authority of the family, counts of Berg since 1077, counts of Altena and Isenberg, then counts of Limburg since 1246, was significantly reduced following the opposition of Frederick II, Count of Isenberg to the aggression of his cousin, the Archbishop of Cologne, Engelbert II of Berg, leading to the murder of the latter. A cadet branch, the Counts van den Marck, later rose in importance as dukes of Cleves, Jülich and Berg, dukes of Nevers and Bouillon, counts of Schleiden, etc.

Today's members are mostly found in Belgium and The Netherlands.

History

The Ezzonian dynasty

The Ezzonen appear in the chronicles with Erenfried I (866-904), count of the Bliesgau, Keldachgau and Bonngau (maybe also count of Charmois). Probably he had Carolingian ancestors, although some historians prefer to link him to former Thuringian kings.

The Ezzonian dynasty (named after Count Palatine Ezzo) were the Counts Palatine of Lotharingia during the 10th and 11th centuries. They were important in governance of the region of the Middle and Lower Rhine. In spite of their military accomplishments in favour of the German emperors, the Ezzonians did not succeed in building a territorial entity in Lotharingia. During a limited period, they were, however, assigned the duchies of Swabia, Bavaria and Carinthia.

Famous members of the dynasty are:

 Ezzo, Count Palatine of Lotharingia (1015–1034). According to the Brauweiler chronicle, he failed to succeed in the monarchy after the death of emperor Otto III (983–1002) in a rivalry with duke Heinrich II of Bavaria (1002–1024). The succession war between Ezzo and Heinrich II continued for over ten years. Both parties came to an agreement after a battle in Odernheim (1011). Kaiserswerth, Duisburg and the surrounding imperial territories were granted as a fief to Ezzo for renouncing the throne (after 1016). When the German crown passed from the Ottonian to the Salian (1024), the Ezzonen remained neutral, apparently after an agreement between Ezzo and Konrad II (1024–1039). The Annales Hildesheimenses record that "Hezo Palatinus comes" died after catching pox from his concubine.
 Otto I, Count Palatine of Lotharingia (1035–1045) and Duke of Swabia (1045–1047). After a successful campaign against the rebelling count of Flanders (margrave of Valenciennes and Ename), Otto received the duchy of Swabia in 1045 in exchange for the cities of Kaiserswerth and Duisburg, which went back to the crown. At the same time, the palatinate of Lotharingia was passed to his nephew.
 Heinrich I Furiosus, Count Palatine of Lotharingia from 1045 until 1060. He was elected as successor for the German kingdom during Emperor Heinrich III's illness. Hearing that his wife Mathilde (daughter of Duke Gozelo of Lotharingia, and sister of pope Stephen IX) had a love-affair with one of his relatives, he killed her with an axe. Heinrich then was enclosed into the abbey of Echternach, where he died in 1061.
 Richeza of Lotharingia, Queen of Poland. Her marriage to Mieszko II was decided as part of peace an agreement between King Bolesław I the Brave and Emperor Otto III. After she returned to Germany after the deposition of her husband in 1031, she became later a nun and today is revered as Blessed Richeza of Lotharingia, celebrated on 21 March.
 Conrad I, Duke of Bavaria, heir of Henry III, Holy Roman Emperor. He was deprived of the dukedom in 1053 when the Emperor installed his son as Duke. He died in exile after an attempt to assassinate the Emperor and seize the throne.
 Conrad III, was installed as Duke of Carinthia in 1057.  The Annales of Berthold record the death in 1061 of Chounradus... Carantanis ducis.
 Hermann I, Archbishop of Cologne, Chancellor of King Zwentibold of Lotharingia.
 Hermann II, Archbishop of Cologne. He became Archchancellor of Italy and protector of Brauweiler (1053). He baptised and crowned the German king Henry IV.
 Hermann II, Count Palatine of Lotharingia (1064–1085), count of the Ruhrgau, Zulpichgau and Brabant. Hermann is assumed to be last of the Ezzonians. After his death (in a duel with Albert III of Namur, nearby his castle of Dalhem on 20 September 1085) the Palatinate of Lotharingia was suspended. His widow remarried with the first count palatine of the Rhine, Henry of Laach.

The surviving line of the Ezzonen descends from Adolf I of Lotharingia, son of Hermann I "Pusillus", Count palatine of Lotharingia.

Counts of Berg

Adolf I of Lotharingia grandson, Adolf I of Berg, Vogt of Werden Abbey, became the first Count of Berg in 1050. The Counts of Berg became the most powerful dynasty in the Rhine region. Early rulers of Berg were:
 Adolf I of Lotharingia, count in Keldachgau, Vogt of Deutz from 1008 until 1018.
 Adolf II of Lotharingia, count in Keldachgau and Vogt of Deutz.
 Adolf I of Berg, 1st Count of Berg from 1077 till 1082, Vogt of Werden, Deutz, Berg and Gerresheim.
 Adolf II of Berg-Hövel (Huvili), Count of Berg from 1082 till 1093. He married in 1035 Adelheid von Laufen, heiress of Hövel, Unna, Telgte, Warendorf, etc. He founded the Altenberg monastery.
 Adolf III, Count of Berg from 1093 till 1132. His son, Eberhard of Berg, 1st Abbot of Georgenthal, convinced his brother Adolf IV to donate the Altenberg monastery to the Cistercian Order. His youngest son, Bruno II, Archbishop of Cologne, died in 1137 in Apulia on campaign with King Lothair of Germany against Roger II of Sicily.
 Adolf IV, Count of Berg from 1132 until 1160 and Count of Altena. He built the Schloss Altena, and built the Altenberg monastery, whose cloister he joined in 1160. He is father of one crusader (Adolf V, killed in Damascus in 1108), two Archbishops of Cologne and Duke of Westfalia and one Prince Bishop of Osnabrück.
 Engelbert I, Count of Berg from 1160 till 1189. He brought stability and prosperity to the county. In July 1189 he was killed on his way to the Holy Land with the Third Crusade.
 Adolf VI, Count of Berg from 1189 till 1218. In 1212 he took part to the Albigensian Crusade against the Cathars. He died in 1218 in combat as commander of the troops in Damiette, in the delta of the Nile, with the Fifth Crusade. He left no son, and Berg passed under the regency of his brother Engelbert II, then to his daughter Irmgard.
 Engelbert II of Berg, Archbishop of Cologne, Regent of Berg from 1218 till 1225, better known as Saint Engelbert of Cologne. He was killed by his cousin Frederick of Isenberg (see below).
 Irmgard, heiress of Berg until 1248, married to Henry IV Duke of Limburg, and future Count of Berg.

Counts of Altena and Isenberg
Eberhard IV of Berg, son of Adolf IV of Berg and Altena, inherited the eastern territorium of County of Berg. With him, the oldest line of the Counts of Berg takes from 1166 the name and title of Counts of Altena (on the Lenne, Westphalia). Eberhard's territorium was later divided between his two sons. His first son, Arnold of Altena, inherited the north-western territorium of Altena (on the Ruhr, Hattingen) in 1200. He founded the line of the Counts of Isenberg and later Counts of Limburg (see below). Frederick I, the second son, inherited the south-eastern territory of Altena, and founded of the line of the Counts von der Marck, from which descend the dukes of Cleves, Jülich and Berg, the dukes of Nevers and Bouillon, the counts of Schleiden, etc.

The murder: from Isenberg to Limburg
Frederick II, Count of Isenberg was a leading figure in the opposition of Westphalian nobles to the aggressive power politics of his cousin, the Archbishop of Cologne, Engelbert II of Berg. In 1225 at the Nobles' Assembly in Soest, Frederick met his cousin Engelbert von Berg in order to bring about a peaceful agreement concerning the stewardship (Vogtei) of the Abbey of Essen which Frederick, according to contemporary complaints, was abusing to his own benefit and to the detriment of the abbey. No conclusion was reached. During their return together from Soest to Cologne, Count Frederick arranged an ambush of his cousin, in a sunken lane of the early medieval historic road from Dortmund to Cologne near Gevelsberg late in the afternoon of 7 November 1225: the Archbishop was killed.

There is no consensus as to whether it was a deliberately planned murder, or whether the Archbishop was killed in the heat of combat. Current research assumes the latter: Engelbert was intended to have been taken into "knightly detention" so that the political demands of the opposing nobility could be pushed through. This was in accordance with the customs of the medieval feuding ethos.

Frederick of Isenberg was outlawed and excommunicated. He was stripped of all offices and stewardships and his personal wealth was confiscated. In the winter of 1225/1226 the new Archbishop of Cologne, Heinrich von Müllenark, besieged and destroyed his castle. His cousin, Adolf von der Mark, was attributed large portions of Frederick's possessions and as such re-united the former territory of Altena.

Frederick travelled with his brothers Dietrich and Engelbert, bishops of Münster and Osnabrück (both also implicated in the death of the Archbishop), and the notary of Isenberg with the necessary documents to the Curia in Rome, in order to have the excommunication lifted. On the return journey Frederick was taken prisoner at Liège and sold for 2,100 silver marks to the chapter of Cologne cathedral. On 14 November 1226 he was executed in front of the Severin Gate. His arms and legs were smashed and he was broken on the wheel, after which he was displayed on a stone pillar. He did not die until the next day.

His son Count Dietrich I of Isenberg, disinherited of all his territories in the Holy Roman Empire following the execution of his father, later fought with the military support of his uncle the Duke of Limburg, to retrieve his paternal inheritance. On 1 May 1243 a peace agreement was signed between Dietrich and Count Adolf von der Mark. He built the castles of Limburg (Hohenlimburg) and Neu Isenberg (soon lost in favour of the Counts von der Mark) and from 1246 took the title of Count of Limburg.  Two of his son's, Johan and Eberhard founded two separate familylines. Johan the eldest died a few years after his marriage. Eberhard inherited after his father's death, the title of count of Limburg, (later on Limburg Broich) taking up residence at the castle Hohenlimburg an der Lenne.Johann acquired Mülheim an der Ruhr and thereby the castle of Styrum, taking up residence there.

16th to 18th century
Count Georg of Limburg-Styrum married in 1539 Irmgarde van Wisch, Lady of Wisch op Oud-Wisch, Wildenborch, Overhagen and Lichtenvoorde, hereditary Countess of Bronckhorst. She inherited the possessions of her uncle, the last count of Bronckhorst and Borculo. Her considerable possessions passed to her son Hermann Georg of Limburg, and the family settled in Gelderland. His grandson, Jobst of Limburg-Styrum, married Maria of Holstein-Pinneberg, heiress of the immediate lordship of Gemen and of Illereichen. Gemen remained for two centuries in the possession of the Counts of Limburg Stirum.

His son Herman Otto I, Count of Limburg and Bronckhorst, lord of Gemen, served in the armies of the Dutch Republic. He commanded Christian of Brunswick's rearguard at the Battle of Stadtlohn (1623) and the Dutch cavalry at the Siege of Groenlo (1627).

In 1644, the three sons of Hermann Otto I divided the family possessions among themselves:

Limburg Bronckhorst
Otto of Limburg obtained the territories of Bronckhorst and Borculo, founding the older line, still flourishing.

In the long conflict (known as the "Borculo question") between the heirs of the last count of Limburg-Bronckhorst, Joost (deceased in 1553 without children), and the Prince-Bishop of Münster over ownership of Borculo, the Court of Gelderland ruled on 20 December 1615 in favour of Count Joost. The ruling was imposed by troops from Zutphen, taking over the castle and city of Lichtenvoorde in December 1615, and the castle and city of Borculo in February 1616 after short combat. Prince Bishop Christoph Bernhard von Galen, tried twice more to keep Borculo under Münster's authority, but without success.

The lordship of Bronckhorst was sold in 1721 by Maria of Limburg Styrum and in 1726 the lordship of Borculo was sold by Count Leopold to the count of Flodorf.

Limburg Stirum Gemen
Adolf Ernst of Limburg Stirum obtained the immediate lordship of Gemen and Illereichen in the 1644 partition and ruled it until his death in 1657, founding the line of Limburg Stirum Gemen. In 1782, with the extinction of the Gemen branch, Gemen was inherited by the line of Limburg Stirum Iller-Aicheheim
 1657-1675 - Countess Maria Isabella von Vehlen und Meggen zu Raesfeld, wife of Adolf Ernst, was regent of Gemen after the death of her husband. The reason for the long regency is not known.
 1675-1704 - Hermann Otto II of Limburg Stirum and Bronckhorst, lord of Gemen, son of the above. He fought in the War of the Spanish Succession in the service of the Holy Roman Emperor Leopold I against France and Bavaria. In 1703, he lost the Battle of Höchstädt against the French-Bavarian forces. In 1704, he led the second assault on enemy positions in the Battle of Schellenberg and was mortally wounded, dying a few days later;
 1704-1743 - Otto Leopold of Limburg Stirum and Bronckhorst, lord of Gemen and Raesfeld, inherited Gemen at the death of his father. He also inherited from his grandfather Alexander IV, Count von Velen zu Raesfeld the lordship of Raesfeld;
 1743-1771 - Friedrich Karl of Limburg Stirum and Bronckhorst, lord of Gemen, son of Otto Leopold. He died in 1771 without descendants and both Gemen and Raesfeld passed to his brother, August Philip;
 1771-1776 - August Philip, Prince-Bishop of Speyer, Count of Limburg Stirum and Bronckhorst, lord of Gemen, brother of the above;
 1776-1798 - Karl Josef, Count of Limburg Stirum, lord of Gemen, cousin of the above;
 1798-1800 - Ferdinand IV, Count of Limburg Stirum zu Illereichen, grandson of the above, was the last lord of Gemen before it passed to the barons von Bomelberg in 1800.
In 1806, Gemen was mediatized to the princes of Salm-Kyrburg. It passed to France in 1810, then to Prussia in 1814.

Limburg Styrum

Moritz of Limburg-Styrum obtained the ownership of Mülheim an der Ruhr and thereby of the immediate lordship of Styrum, and later Oberstein. Here he founded the line of counts of Limburg-Styrum-Styrum, extinct in 1809. Moritz later also became hereditary banneret of the Principality of Guelders and of the County of Zutphen. He married his cousin Maria Bernhardine of Limburg-Bronckhorst.

In the mediatisation of 1806, Styrum came under control of the Grand Duchy of Berg. The last count of Limburg-Styrum-Styrum, Ernst (deceased on 23 March 1809) left Styrum to the sister of his wife, Maria Margaretha von Humbracht, who sold it in 1825. Oberstein was mediatized at the Treaty of Lunéville in 1801, however Ernst was never compensated by the Final Recess of the Empire in 1803.

Mediatisation
The Limburg Stirum held seats in the Holy Roman Empire's Imperial Diet until 1800, through their possessions of immediate lordships in Gemen, Oberstein, Styrum, etc.

When the branch of Gemen became extinct in 1800, the branch of Styrum failed to inherit their possessions, and Gemen passed to the barons von Boyneburg-Bömelberg. In 1806 the Confederation of the Rhine occurred and Gemen was mediatised to the Principality of Salm-Kyrburg.

At the same moment Styrum was mediatised to the Grand Duchy of Berg. This branch became extinct three years later, in 1809. Since the Limburg Stirum held no imperial estate when the Holy Roman Empire was dissolved in 1806 (Gemen had been lost in 1800 and it is unclear if the Styrum branch did inherit the dynastic rights associated with Gemen), nor were any Limburg Stirum living in the German Confederation when the Congress of Vienna finalised the distinctions between the sovereign and non-sovereign dynasties of the former Empire (at that time all members were living in the newly created Kingdom of the Netherlands), the House of Limburg Stirum's centuries of previous status as immediate Reichsgrafen was not internationally recognised, nor was their head granted the style of Erlaucht (Illustrious Highness) and they were omitted from Section II of the Almanach de Gotha, which listed therein the other princely and countly families of mediatised dynastic rank. The house of Limburg Stirum is nevertheless considered part of the Standesherren by most authors on the subject.

19th century until today

The titles of the House of Limburg Stirum were confirmed in 1812 by Napoleon I and in 1814 the family was recognised in the nobility of the Kingdom of the Netherlands (name: van Limburg Stirum).

Notable figures in recent history are:
 Leopold, Count of Limburg Stirum (1758–1840), Lieutenant General of Dutch Infantry, and member of the Driemanschap, the triumvirate that took power in 1813 in the name of the Prince of Orange-Nassau in order to establish the monarchy in the Netherlands. The three statesmen invited the exiled Prince of Orange, later King William I of the Netherlands, to The Hague to avoid anarchy following the retreat of France's troops, and to avoid possible absorption of the Netherlands by Prussia or England.
 Menno David, Count of Limburg Stirum (1807–1891) was a Dutch general and government minister. He lost his right leg during the Siege of Antwerp (1832). After serving as Dutch minister of war he became aide-de-camp and advisor to King William III of the Netherlands.
 Friedrich zu Limburg-Stirum was a German diplomat and politician who served as foreign minister of Germany in 1880–1881.
 Mathilde van Limburg Stirum (1854-1932), secret fiancée of Prince William of Orange, heir of King William III of Netherlands, and great-grandmother of Cara Delevingne.
 Johan Paul van Limburg Stirum (1873–1948), Dutch diplomat and reformist Governor-General of the Dutch East Indies. He worked for the economic development, decentralisation and the autonomy of the colony. He would later become ambassador to Berlin where he was known for his critical views on National Socialism, even refusing Nazi officials entry to the Dutch embassy. After leaving Berlin he would serve as Dutch envoy to London.  
 Otto Ernst Gelder van Limburg Stirum was a Dutch magistrate and maternal uncle to Audrey Hepburn. As a prominent Dutchman he was taken hostage by the German occupiers and was one of five Dutchmen to be executed in retaliation for resistance activities on 17 April 1942. These five were the first Dutch hostages to suffer this fate. 
 Charles de Limburg Stirum (15 September 1906 - 14 June 1989), a Belgian senator, member of the armed resistance during World War II, was later Grand Master of the Royal Households of King Leopold III of Belgium. He became a Knight of the Order of the Golden Fleece (Austrian branch).
 Franz von Limburg Stirum, a claimant to the headship of the House, lives in Finland.

Others
 The Limburg-Styrum Dragoons Regiment fought with six squadrons (500 men) during the battles of Schellenberg and Blenheim in 1704 during the War of the Spanish Succession; and in the Battle of Melle in 1745 during the War of the Austrian Succession. The Styrum Dragoons uniform was a red coat with green facings, white buttons and straw-yellow breeches. It was disbanded in 1748.
 The Counts of Limburg Stirum created two orders of knighthood: the Order of the Four Emperors and the Order of St Philip of the Lion of Limburg. In 1806 the Counts of Limburg Stirum were mediatized and lost their rights on their territories. However the Order of St Philip of the Lion of Limburg was still in use until 1838.
 Limburg Stirum is also the name of a mountain, 2350 meters high, standing in the Belgica Mountains in Antarctic. It was discovered by the Belgian expedition (1957–58) under G. de Gerlache, who named it for Count Charles de Limburg Stirum, a patron of the expedition.
 The Jerusalem Church in Bruges (Belgium) was founded in 1428 by the Adornes family. Anselm Adornes completed this remarkable building after his return from pilgrimage to Jerusalem. It was intended to be a copy of the Church of the Holy Sepulchre in Jerusalem. The Jerusalem Church is still today private property and belongs to the Limburg Stirum as direct descendants of the Adornes.
 In Belgium, Count Evrard de Limburg Stirum (1927–2001), the oldest son of Thierry, Count of Limburg Stirum and Princess Marie-Immaculée de Croÿ, married Princess Hélène d'Orléans (1934-), a daughter of Henri d'Orléans, Comte de Paris, the Orléanist claimant to the throne of France. After several years in Rhodesia, they settled in the Castle of Huldenberg in Belgium.
 Count Alexis de Limburg Stirum married, in the Castle of Ussé (France), Béatrix de Blacas d'Aulps, daughter of the 7th Duke and Prince of Blacas d'Aulps. They live in the castle of Walzin (Belgium).
 Count Rodolphe de Limburg Stirum, son of Count Christian de Limburg Stirum and grandson of Count Thierry, married on 6 December 2008 in Mechelen, Archduchess Marie-Christine of Austria, a niece of Henri, Grand Duke of Luxembourg. She is the great-granddaughter of King Leopold III of Belgium through her mother Archduchess Marie Astrid of Austria, and of Emperor Charles I of Austria through her father Archduke Carl Christian of Austria. They have three sons (Leopold, Constantin and Gabriel).

Gallery

See also
 Belgian nobility

Literature

 Genealogische Handbuch des Adels, Gräfliche Häuser A Band II, 1955;
 W. Gf v. Limburg Stirum, "Stamtafel der Graven van Limburg Stirum", 's Gravenhage 1878;
 A.M.H.J. Stokvis, "Manuel d'Histoire, de Genealogie et de Chronologie de tous les États du Globe", Tome III, Leiden 1890–93;
 W. K. Prins v. Isenburg, "Stammtafeln zur Geschichte der Europaischen Staaten", 2. Aufl., Marburg/Lahn, 1953.

References

External links

 
 On Mount Limburg Stirum (Antarctic)

 

Limburg
Dutch noble families
Huldenberg